Herbulotiana longifascia is a species of moth in the family Depressariidae. It was described by Pierre Viette in 1954. It is found in Madagascar.

References

Moths described in 1954
Herbulotiana
Taxa named by Pierre Viette